St. Peter's Church, Eaton Square, is a Church of England parish church at the east end of Eaton Square, Belgravia, London. It is a neoclassical building designed by the architect Henry Hakewill with a hexastyle portico with Ionic columns and a clock tower. On 19 October 1991 The Times newspaper wrote "St Peter’s must now rank as one of the most beautiful churches in London". It is a Grade II* listed building.

History

St Peter's was built between 1824 and 1827 during the first development of Eaton Square. The interior was, as was common at the time, a "preaching box", with galleries in three sides and the organ and choir at the west end. James Elmes called the effect "chaste and simple".

This building burnt down, and in 1837 was rebuilt from Hakewill's drawings by one of his sons. The original building was a Commissioners' church, receiving a grant from the Church Building Commission towards its cost. The full cost of the building was £22,427 (equivalent to £ in ), towards which the Commission paid £5,556.

In 1875, the church was enlarged and reordered to designs by Sir Arthur Blomfield, who added a chancel at the east end and north and south transepts and "fiercely normanized" the interior. Internally Blomfield's chancel and transepts are Romanesque Revival, but externally they conform with Hakewill's neoclassical style.

From its founding St Peter's, Eaton Square, was considered in Pimlico and until at least 1878 was usually recorded as St Peter's, Pimlico. In 1951 the crypt containing some 400 burials was cleared and the remains reinterred at Brookwood Cemetery in Surrey.

Choristers for the choir were provided by London Choir School until 1958 when the choir school closed.

Arson and rebuilding
On 20 October 1987 an anti-Catholic arsonist set fire to the east end, in the mistaken belief that the building was a Roman Catholic chapel. Within hours the church was engulfed. By the next day the fire was out but only the Georgian shell of the building remained. It was roofless, with most of its furnishings destroyed.

The church needed total rebuilding. The Braithwaite Partnership of architects was appointed to completely redesign the building with a new and simpler interior, and to incorporate within the site a vicarage, offices, flats for a curate, verger and music director, a meeting hall, nursery school rooms and a large playroom for the church's youth club.

Work on the new church began at Easter 1990 and was completed in 1991. It retained the grand Georgian portico but beyond that the interior is described by visitors as clean, bright and modern. The choir and organ are at the west end, as in the 1827 plan, but the fittings are thoroughly modern. The church is accessible and has disabled-accessible toilets. Behind the altar is an apse that is decorated entirely with gold mosaic. Around the side of the apse, part of the 1873 sanctuary which survived the fire can be seen, and also a side chapel now used as the vestry office, complete with stained glass.

Present day
St Peter's stands in the liberal Anglo-Catholic tradition of the Church of England. It holds Book of Common Prayer as well as Common Worship services.

Notable weddings
Edith Helen Chaplin and Charles Vane-Tempest-Stewart, Viscount Castlereagh, 28 November 1899
Margaret Campbell Geddes and Prince Ludwig of Hesse and by Rhine, 17 November 1937. The wedding had been planned for the day after but was moved forward after Prince Ludwig's family perished in the Sabena OO-AUB Ostend crash.
Lady Camilla Bingham and Michael Bloch, 12 September 1998
Gertrude Vernon and Sir Andrew Agnew, 9th Baronet, 15 October 1889
Dorothea Beighton and J. A. Middleton, MC, 4 January 1921
Prince Victor Duleep Singh and Lady Anne Blanche Alice of Coventry, 4 April 1898

See also
List of Commissioners' churches in London
Mother Cecile of Grahamstown

References

Sources

External links

St Peter's Eaton Square
 (not accessible)
St Peter's Eaton Square C of E Primary School

19th-century Church of England church buildings
Eaton Square
Belgravia
Church of England church buildings in the City of Westminster
Churches completed in 1827
Churches completed in 1837
Churches completed in 1875
Churches completed in 1991
London, Saint Peters Church, Eaton Square
Diocese of London
Georgian architecture in the City of Westminster
Grade II* listed churches in the City of Westminster
Greek Revival church buildings in the United Kingdom
Neoclassical architecture in London
Religious buildings and structures in the United Kingdom destroyed by arson
Rebuilt churches in the United Kingdom
Neoclassical church buildings in England